Dr. Shikoh Gitau (circa 1981) is a Kenyan computer scientist.  She finished her undergraduate studies in Computer Science at the Africa Nazarene University and attained her PhD at University of Cape Town. She is known for inventing M-Ganga and Ummeli, mobile applications for promoting health and medicine and matching unemployed workers with employment opportunities. Gitau was the first African to win the Google Anita Borg Memorial Scholarship, received in the Grace Hopper Celebration of Women in Computing based on her inventions and thesis. She contributes and manages the Technology Innovations for Inclusive Growth program, where she is presently employed in the Africa Development Bank (AfDB).

Early life
Gitau was born to a working-class family in Mathare. Soon after her birth, her family lost their property in Mathare in the aftermath of the 1982 Kenyan Coup D'état Attempt and were forced to settle with relatives in Nakuru. During her childhood in Nakuru, Gitau saw her first collegiate graduation ceremony on television. She credits witnessing a woman receive a PhD from then-president Daniel arap Moi during this broadcast with motivating her to pursue higher education.

Gitau completed her undergraduate studies at the Africa Nazarene University (ANU) in Nairobi. Her career at ANU was marked by academic excellence: she remained on the Honor Roll and Dean's List during all four years of her education, and earned the university's Merit and Leadership Awards in 2003 and 2005, respectively. After receiving her degree, she worked briefly as a UNICEF volunteer before taking a job as a program's assistant at the Centre for Multiparty Democracy, a Kenyan political activism group. She worked there until 2007, when she enrolled in the University of Cape Town to pursue an M.Sc. and subsequently a PhD in Computer Science.

Career
Gitau has worked in a plethora of different areas to benefit African development. Her most notable career achievement is her mobile application "Ummeli". This application, created in June 2010, matches unemployed people with employers in need of their skills. Due to its low cost and practical use, its potential to change unemployment in labor markets is very high. Umelli is available in South Africa now and is projected to become available in other African countries. In December 2010, Gitau started working for Google Inc's Emerging Markets where she "identified, researched and designed the www.beba.co.keconcept and worked on its introduction to Kenya’s Transit system". In January 2011, Gitau was a co-founder and research mentor for iHub_Research, where she was on the forefront of research on mobile internet usage in Africa and worked on the Microsoft oneApp project. Currently, Gitau works in the ICT department of the African Development Bank (AfDB) working on developing various projects with different governments across Africa.

Awards and Recognitions
On July 31, 2013, Gitau became one of three people to win the ABIE Change Agent Award. She made history by becoming the first African to win the Google Anita Borg Memorial Scholarship. She was recognized with fellow honorees in Minneapolis, Minnesota on October 5 during the Grace Hopper Celebration of Women in Computing (GHC).

In 2017, Gitau was recognized as the Most Influential Women CEO Global for East Africa under the Information and communications technology (ICT) sector by the Independent Magazine.

Other
 2005 Top Ten Finalists for Oxford Rhodes Memorial Scholarship
 2013 AfroElle Power List of African women who affect change
 2015 Top 40 under 40 women to watch in Kenya
 2015 ASPEN New Voices Fellow

References

University of Cape Town alumni
Kenyan computer scientists
Kenyan women computer scientists
Africa Nazarene University alumni
Living people
1980s births
Year of birth uncertain